Acute kidney injury (AKI), previously called acute renal failure (ARF), is a sudden decrease in kidney function that develops within 7 days, as shown by an increase in serum creatinine or a decrease in urine output, or both.

Causes of AKI are classified as either prerenal (due to decreased blood flow to the kidney), intrinsic renal (due to damage to the kidney itself), or postrenal (due to blockage of urine flow). Prerenal causes of AKI include sepsis, dehydration, excessive blood loss, cardiogenic shock, heart failure, cirrhosis, and certain medications like ACE inhibitors or NSAIDs. Intrinsic renal causes of AKI include glomerulonephritis, lupus nephritis, acute tubular necrosis, certain antibiotics, and chemotherapeutic agents. Postrenal causes of AKI include kidney stones, bladder cancer, neurogenic bladder, enlargement of the prostate, narrowing of the urethra, and certain medications like anticholinergics.

The diagnosis of AKI is made based on a person's signs and symptoms, along with lab tests for serum creatinine and measurement of urine output. Other tests include urine microscopy and urine electrolytes. Renal ultrasound can be obtained when a postrenal cause is suspected. A kidney biopsy may be obtained when intrinsic renal AKI is suspected and the cause is unclear.

AKI is seen in 10-15% of people admitted to the hospital and in more than 50% of people admitted to the intensive care unit (ICU). AKI may lead to a number of complications, including metabolic acidosis, high potassium levels, uremia, changes in body fluid balance, effects on other organ systems, and death. People who have experienced AKI are at increased risk of developing chronic kidney disease in the future. Management includes treatment of the underlying cause and supportive care, such as renal replacement therapy.

Signs and symptoms
The clinical presentation is often dominated by the underlying cause. The various symptoms of acute kidney injury result from the various disturbances of kidney function that are associated with the disease. Accumulation of urea and other nitrogen-containing substances in the bloodstream lead to a number of symptoms, such as fatigue, loss of appetite, headache, nausea, and vomiting. Marked increases in the potassium level can lead to abnormal heart rhythms, which can be severe and life-threatening. Fluid balance is frequently affected, though blood pressure can be high, low, or normal.

Pain in the flanks may be encountered in some conditions (such as clotting of the kidneys' blood vessels or inflammation of the kidney). This is the result of stretching of the fibrous tissue capsule surrounding the kidney. If the kidney injury is the result of dehydration, there may be thirst as well as evidence of fluid depletion on physical examination. Physical examination may also provide other clues as to the underlying cause of the kidney problem, such as a rash in interstitial nephritis (or vasculitis) and a palpable bladder in obstructive nephropathy.

Causes

Prerenal
Prerenal causes of AKI ("pre-renal azotemia") are those that decrease effective blood flow to the kidney and cause a decrease in the glomerular filtration rate (GFR). Both kidneys need to be affected as one kidney is still more than adequate for normal kidney function. Notable causes of prerenal AKI include low blood volume (e.g., dehydration), low blood pressure, heart failure (leading to cardiorenal syndrome), hepatorenal syndrome in the context of liver cirrhosis, and local changes to the blood vessels supplying the kidney. The latter include renal artery stenosis, or the narrowing of the renal artery which supplies the kidney with blood, and renal vein thrombosis, which is the formation of a blood clot in the renal vein that drains blood from the kidney.

Intrinsic or renal
Intrinsic AKI refers to disease processes which directly damage the kidney itself. Intrinsic AKI can be due to one or more of the kidney's structures including the glomeruli, kidney tubules, or the interstitium. Common causes of each are glomerulonephritis, acute tubular necrosis (ATN), and acute interstitial nephritis (AIN), respectively. Other causes of intrinsic AKI are rhabdomyolysis and tumor lysis syndrome. Certain medication classes such as calcineurin inhibitors (e.g., tacrolimus) can also directly damage the tubular cells of the kidney and result in a form of intrinsic AKI.

Postrenal
Postrenal AKI refers to acute kidney injury caused by disease states downstream of the kidney and most often occurs as a consequence of urinary tract obstruction. This may be related to benign prostatic hyperplasia, kidney stones, obstructed urinary catheter, bladder stones, or cancer of the bladder, ureters, or prostate.

Diagnosis

Definition
Introduced by the KDIGO in 2012, specific criteria exist for the diagnosis of AKI.

AKI can be diagnosed if any one of the following is present:
 Increase in SCr by ≥0.3 mg/dl (≥26.5 μmol/L) within 48 hours; or
 Increase in SCr to ≥1.5 times baseline, which has occurred within the prior 7 days; or
 Urine volume < 0.5 mL/kg/h for 6 hours.

Staging
The RIFLE criteria, proposed by the Acute Dialysis Quality Initiative (ADQI) group, aid in assessment of the severity of a person's acute kidney injury. The acronym RIFLE is used to define the spectrum of progressive kidney injury seen in AKI:

 Risk: 1.5-fold increase in the serum creatinine, or glomerular filtration rate (GFR) decrease by 25 percent, or urine output <0.5 mL/kg per hour for six hours.
 Injury: Two-fold increase in the serum creatinine, or GFR decrease by 50 percent, or urine output <0.5 mL/kg per hour for 12 hours.
 Failure: Three-fold increase in the serum creatinine, or GFR decrease by 75 percent, or urine output of <0.3 mL/kg per hour for 24 hours, or no urine output (anuria) for 12 hours.
 Loss: Complete loss of kidney function (e.g., need for renal replacement therapy) for more than four weeks.
 End-stage kidney disease: Complete loss of kidney function (e.g., need for renal replacement therapy) for more than three months.

Evaluation
The deterioration of kidney function may be signaled by a measurable decrease in urine output. Often, it is diagnosed on the basis of blood tests for substances normally eliminated by the kidney: urea and creatinine. Additionally, the ratio of BUN to creatinine is used to evaluate kidney injury. Both tests have their disadvantages. For instance, it takes about 24 hours for the creatinine level to rise, even if both kidneys have ceased to function. A number of alternative markers have been proposed (such as NGAL, KIM-1, IL18 and cystatin C), but none of them are established enough as of 2018 to replace creatinine as a marker of kidney function.

Once the diagnosis of AKI is made, further testing is often required to determine the underlying cause. It is useful to perform a bladder scan or a post void residual to rule out urinary retention. In post void residual, a catheter is inserted into the urinary tract immediately after urinating to measure fluid still in the bladder. 50–100 mL suggests neurogenic bladder dysfunction.

These may include urine sediment analysis, renal ultrasound and/or kidney biopsy. Indications for kidney biopsy in the setting of AKI include the following:
 Unexplained AKI, in a patient with two non-obstructed normal sized kidneys.
 AKI in the presence of the nephritic syndrome.
 Systemic disease associated with AKI.
 Kidney transplant dysfunction.

In medical imaging, the acute changes in the kidney are often examined with renal ultrasonography as the first-line modality, where CT scan and magnetic resonance imaging (MRI) are used for the follow-up examinations and when US fails to demonstrate abnormalities. In evaluation of the acute changes in the kidney, the echogenicity of the renal structures, the delineation of the kidney, the renal vascularity, kidney size and focal abnormalities are observed. CT is preferred in renal traumas, but US is used for follow-up, especially in the patients suspected for the formation of urinomas. A CT scan of the abdomen will also demonstrate bladder distension or hydronephrosis.

Classification
Acute kidney injury is diagnosed on the basis of clinical history and laboratory data. A diagnosis is made when there is a rapid reduction in kidney function, as measured by serum creatinine, or based on a rapid reduction in urine output, termed oliguria (less than 400 mLs of urine per 24 hours).

AKI can be caused by systemic disease (such as a manifestation of an autoimmune disease, e.g. lupus nephritis), crush injury, contrast agents, some antibiotics, and more. AKI often occurs due to multiple processes. The most common cause is dehydration and sepsis combined with nephrotoxic drugs, especially following surgery or contrast agents.

The causes of acute kidney injury are commonly categorized into prerenal, intrinsic, and postrenal.

Acute kidney injury occurs in up to 30% of patients following cardiac surgery. Mortality increases by 60-80% in post-cardiopulmonary bypass patients who go on to require renal replacement therapy. Preoperative creatinine greater than 1.2 mg/dL, combined valve and bypass procedures, emergency surgery, and preoperative intra-aortic balloon pump are risk factors most strongly correlated with post-cardiopulmonary bypass acute kidney injury. Other well-known minor risk factors include female gender, congestive heart failure, chronic obstructive pulmonary disease, insulin-requiring diabetes, and depressed left ventricular ejection fraction. Volatile anesthetic agents have been shown to increase renal sympathetic nerve activity (RSNA), which causes retention of salts and water, diminished renal blood flow (RBF) and an increase in serum renin levels, but not in antidiuretic hormone (ADH).

Treatment
The management of AKI hinges on identification and treatment of the underlying cause. The main objectives of initial management are to prevent cardiovascular collapse and death and to call for specialist advice from a nephrologist. In addition to treatment of the underlying disorder, management of AKI routinely includes the avoidance of substances that are toxic to the kidneys, called nephrotoxins. These include NSAIDs such as ibuprofen or naproxen, iodinated contrasts such as those used for CT scans, many antibiotics such as gentamicin, and a range of other substances.

Monitoring of kidney function, by serial serum creatinine measurements and monitoring of urine output, is routinely performed. In the hospital, insertion of a urinary catheter helps monitor urine output and relieves possible bladder outlet obstruction, such as with an enlarged prostate.

Prerenal
In prerenal AKI without fluid overload, administration of intravenous fluids is typically the first step to improving kidney function. Volume status may be monitored with the use of a central venous catheter to avoid over- or under-replacement of fluid.

If low blood pressure persists despite providing a person with adequate amounts of intravenous fluid, medications that increase blood pressure (vasopressors) such as norepinephrine, and in certain circumstances medications that improve the heart's ability to pump (known as inotropes) such as dobutamine may be given to improve blood flow to the kidney. While a useful vasopressor, there is no evidence to suggest that dopamine is of any specific benefit and may in fact be harmful.

Intrinsic
The myriad causes of intrinsic AKI require specific therapies. For example, intrinsic AKI due to vasculitis or glomerulonephritis may respond to steroid medication, cyclophosphamide, and (in some cases) plasma exchange. Toxin-induced prerenal AKI often responds to discontinuation of the offending agent, such as ACE inhibitors, ARB antagonists, aminoglycosides, penicillins, NSAIDs, or paracetamol.

The use of diuretics such as furosemide, is widespread and sometimes convenient in improving fluid overload. It is not associated with higher mortality (risk of death), nor with any reduced mortality or length of intensive care unit or hospital stay.

Postrenal
If the cause is obstruction of the urinary tract, relief of the obstruction (with a nephrostomy or urinary catheter) may be necessary.

Renal replacement therapy
Renal replacement therapy, such as with hemodialysis, may be instituted in some cases of AKI. Renal replacement therapy can be applied intermittently (IRRT) and continuously (CRRT). Study results regarding differences in outcomes between IRRT and CRRT are inconsistent. A systematic review of the literature in 2008 demonstrated no difference in outcomes between the use of intermittent hemodialysis and continuous venovenous hemofiltration (CVVH) (a type of continuous hemodialysis). Among critically ill patients, intensive renal replacement therapy with CVVH does not appear to improve outcomes compared to less intensive intermittent hemodialysis. However, other clinical and health economic studies demonstrated that, initiation of CRRT is associated with a lower likelihood of chronic dialysis and was cost-effective compared with IRRT in patients with acute kidney injury.

Complications
Metabolic acidosis, hyperkalemia, and pulmonary edema may require medical treatment with sodium bicarbonate, antihyperkalemic measures, and diuretics.

Lack of improvement with fluid resuscitation, therapy-resistant hyperkalemia, metabolic acidosis, or fluid overload may necessitate artificial support in the form of dialysis or hemofiltration. However, oliguria during anesthesia may predict AKI, but the effect of a fluid load is highly variable. Striving toward a predefined urine output  target to prevent AKI is futile.

Early recovery of AKI
AKI recovery can be classified into three stages 1–3 on the basis of the inverse of the AKI KDIGO serum creatinine criteria.

Prognosis

Mortality
Mortality after AKI remains high. AKI has a death rate as high as 20%, which may reach up to 50% in the intensive care unit (ICU). Each year, around two million people die of AKI worldwide.

AKI develops in 5% to 30% of patients who undergo cardiothoracic surgery, depending on the definition used for AKI. If AKI develops after major abdominal surgery (13.4% of all people who have undergone major abdominal surgery) the risk of death is markedly increased (over 12-fold).

Kidney function
Depending on the cause, a proportion of patients (5–10%) will never regain full kidney function, thus entering end-stage kidney failure and requiring lifelong dialysis or a kidney transplant. Patients with AKI are more likely to die prematurely after being discharged from hospital, even if their kidney function has recovered.

The risk of developing chronic kidney disease is increased (8.8-fold).

Epidemiology
New cases of AKI are unusual but not rare, affecting approximately 0.1% of the UK population per year (2000 ppm/year), 20x incidence of new ESKD (end-stage kidney disease). AKI requiring dialysis (10% of these) is rare (200 ppm/year), 2x incidence of new ESKD.

There is an increased incidence of AKI in agricultural workers because of occupational hazards such as dehydration and heat illness. No other traditional risk factors, including age, BMI, diabetes, or hypertension, were associated with incident AKI.

Acute kidney injury is common among hospitalized patients. It affects some 3–7% of patients admitted to the hospital and approximately 25–30% of patients in the intensive care unit.

Acute kidney injury was one of the most expensive conditions seen in U.S. hospitals in 2011, with an aggregated cost of nearly $4.7 billion for approximately 498,000 hospital stays. This was a 346% increase in hospitalizations from 1997, when there were 98,000 acute kidney injury stays. According to a review article of 2015, there has been an increase in cases of acute kidney injury in the last 20 years which cannot be explained solely by changes to the manner of reporting.

History
Before the advancement of modern medicine, acute kidney injury was referred to as uremic poisoning while uremia was contamination of the blood with urine. Starting around 1847, uremia came to be used for reduced urine output, a condition now called oliguria, which was thought to be caused by the urine's mixing with the blood instead of being voided through the urethra.

Acute kidney injury due to acute tubular necrosis (ATN) was recognized in the 1940s in the United Kingdom, where crush injury victims during the London Blitz developed patchy necrosis of kidney tubules, leading to a sudden decrease in kidney function. During the Korean and Vietnam wars, the incidence of AKI decreased due to better acute management and administration of intravenous fluids.

See also

 BUN-to-creatinine ratio
 Chronic kidney disease
 Dialysis
 Genitourinary tract injury
 Kidney failure
 Rhabdomyolysis
 Contrast-induced nephropathy
 Ischemia-reperfusion injury of the appendicular musculoskeletal system
 Kidney Ischemia

References

External links 

Medical emergencies
Kidney diseases
Organ failure
Causes of death